Tony Young may refer to:

 Tony Young (director) (1917–1966), British film director and television producer
 Tony Young (politician) (born 1966), San Diego city councillor
 Tony Young (actor) (1937–2002), American film and TV actor
 Tony Young (footballer) (born 1952), English former footballer
 Tony Young (martial artist) (born 1962), African American martial artist
 Anthony M. Young, Australian mycologist
 Tony Young, Canadian television and radio personality, known as Master T

See also
 Anthony Young (disambiguation)